Niko Snellman (born March 12, 1988) is a Finnish former professional ice hockey player. He was drafted 105th overall by the Nashville Predators in the 2006 NHL Entry Draft.

Snellman played eleven games in the SM-liiga for Ilves during the 2009-10 SM-liiga season, registering one assist. He also played in Mestis for Lempäälän Kisa, Kiekko-Laser and Jokipojat.

External links

1988 births
Living people
Finnish expatriate ice hockey players in Canada
Finnish ice hockey left wingers
Jokipojat players
Kiekko-Laser players
Ilves players
Lempäälän Kisa players
Nashville Predators draft picks
Regina Pats players
Ice hockey people from Tampere